CXG may refer to:

Construction grammar (CxG), a family of theories in the field of cognitive and evolutionary linguistics
Crazy Ex-Girlfriend, a 2015 American romantic musical comedy-drama television series